Georges Santos (born 15 August 1970) is a former professional footballer and club scout for English Premier League side West Ham United.

As a player he was a defender and a midfielder in a career that lasted from 1997 to 2009. He notably played in the Football League for Tranmere Rovers, West Bromwich Albion, Sheffield United, Grimsby Town, Ipswich Town and Queens Park Rangers. Having also had spells with Toulon, Brighton & Hove Albion, Oxford United, Chesterfield, Alfreton Town, Farsley Celtic and Fleetwood Town. Born in France, he was capped four times by Cape Verde.

Club career

Tranmere Rovers
Santos turned professional with Toulon, before moving to England to join Tranmere Rovers in 1998 who were managed by former Liverpool striker John Aldridge. He made his debut for Rovers on 8 August 1998 in a 2–0 defeat against Wolverhampton Wanderers in the First Division. He went on to make 54 appearances for Rovers, scoring twice between August 1998 and March 2000. After refusing to sign a new contract he was dropped by Aldridge, and as a result missed the 2000 Football League Cup Final, and left the club shortly afterwards.

West Bromwich Albion
On transfer-deadline day in 1999–2000 he moved to Gary Megson's West Bromwich Albion, where he helped the club preserve their Division One status in a toughly fought relegation battle that saw The Baggies and Grimsby Town scramble out of danger at the expense of Port Vale, Walsall and Swindon Town. After featuring in only 8 games for Albion and after refusing to commit to a long-term deal at Albion, he left the club in the middle of 2000.

Sheffield United
Georges signed for Albion's league rivals Sheffield United soon after departing from The Hawthorns. Santos was in and out of the Blades team and notched up 68 appearances, with 6 goals scored during his time under Neil Warnock at Bramall Lane. Santos' 2001–02 season with Sheffield United turned out to be a career low point when he was one of three Sheffield United players to be sent off in the notorious Battle of Bramall Lane, a match against his former club West Brom that was abandoned when United's team was cut down to 6 players following three sending-offs and two injuries. With Goalkeeper Simon Tracey already off the field, the match had its climax in the 65th minute, when Santos, whom United had just brought on seconds earlier, was sent off for a high two-footed lunging tackle on Andy Johnson; Johnson had previously fractured Santos' cheekbone and seriously damaged his eye socket with a swinging elbow while playing for Nottingham Forest, and this was in fact their first encounter since the incident. The two teams then scuffled on the pitch; in the melee, another United substitute, Patrick Suffo, was sent off for head-butting Derek McInnes. Soon after, United captain Keith Curle was fortunate to avoid a sending off after appearing to throw punches at McInnes. Warnock never selected Santos again, and this was his final appearance as a Sheffield United player.

Grimsby Town
After remaining without a club until December 2002, Santos joined Grimsby Town, signing a deal until the end of the season. He notably scored his only goal for Grimsby in a 2–0 victory over local rivals and fellow relegation strugglers Sheffield Wednesday, towering above his marker to power home a header from the centre of the penalty area following a Stuart Campbell corner. Santos became a popular figure amongst the club's supporters and he was singled out for a lot of praise despite the club's overall poor form during the season. Initially signed as a midfielder, Santos had been drafted in as a makeshift centre half when Steve Chettle was ruled out for a lengthy period. He was usually paired with Jamaican youngster Simon Ford or player/manager Paul Groves who incidentally this season had adopted playing at centre half in opposed to his regular central midfield sitting. Despite the best efforts of Santos he was unable to help save the Mariners from relegation from the First Division, but went on to be awarded with the Player of the Season award for his stone wall like performances at the back. Despite winning this award and putting himself in the running for club captain for the 2003–04 campaign, Santos rejected a new contract in order to stay in the First Division.

Ipswich Town
In the summer of 2003 he parted company with Grimsby and joined Joe Royle's Ipswich Town on a three-month contract. He made his debut on 8 August 2003 in the club's 1–1 league draw with Reading He stayed at Portman Road for the entire 2003–04 season, scoring once against Cardiff City, and would go on to make a total of 36 appearances in all competitions.

Queens Park Rangers
George moved on again, signing a two-year contract at Queens Park Rangers (QPR) in summer 2004. He remained with Rangers for several seasons notching up an impressive 77 appearances, scoring 6 goals for the London-based Loftus Road club. He would depart the club at the end of the 2005–06 season.

Brighton & Hove Albion and Chesterfield
Santos joined Brighton & Hove Albion in August 2006, turning down an offer to return to former club Grimsby, something he later admitted in an interview as the biggest mistake in his career. Santos played only 12 times for Brighton in all competitions before he joined Oxford United on 5 January 2007 on loan until the end of the 2006–07 season. He was released by Brighton in May 2007.

On 31 August 2007, he joined Chesterfield for a month on non-contract terms, but failed to make an appearance and on 1 November 2007 he left Chesterfield.

Alfreton Town, Farsley Celtic and Fleetwood Town
On 7 November 2007, Santos went on trial at Rotherham United but failed to impress the staff at Millmoor. He later joined Conference North club Alfreton Town for his first taste of Non-League football.

In January 2008 he moved to Farsley Celtic where he remained for the remainder of the 2007–08 campaign. Despite being an integral part of the first team, Santos left the club only a few weeks into the 2008–09 season.

On 29 September 2008, he joined Fleetwood Town, who would go on to be his last club.

International career
Santos, although born in France, qualified to play for Cape Verde through his parents, who are both originally from the islands. He made his international debut for Cape Verde on 6 September 2002 in an Africa Cup of Nations qualifying match against Mauritania.

Football scout
Santos began working as a European scout for Manchester City in 2013. He went on to scout for RCD Mallorca, Olympique de Marseille and currently West Ham United.

Career statistics

References

External links

1970 births
Living people
Footballers from Marseille
French footballers
Cape Verdean footballers
Cape Verde international footballers
Association football defenders
Association football midfielders
Association football utility players
SC Toulon players
Tranmere Rovers F.C. players
West Bromwich Albion F.C. players
Sheffield United F.C. players
Grimsby Town F.C. players
Ipswich Town F.C. players
Queens Park Rangers F.C. players
Brighton & Hove Albion F.C. players
Oxford United F.C. players
Chesterfield F.C. players
Alfreton Town F.C. players
Farsley Celtic A.F.C. players
Fleetwood Town F.C. players
English Football League players
National League (English football) players
Cape Verdean people of French descent
French sportspeople of Cape Verdean descent
Sheffield United F.C. non-playing staff
Manchester City F.C. non-playing staff
West Ham United F.C. non-playing staff